The Singapore Derby is a thoroughbred horse race held annually in mid July at the Singapore Turf Club. Contested on turf over a left-handed course, the domestic Group 1 race is run over a distance 1,800 metres (9 furlongs) and is open to four-year-old horses only.

Inaugurated in 1880 at the Serangoon Road Race Course at Farrer Park, it was raced there until 1910 at which time it was cancelled. The Singapore Derby was revived in 1959 under the auspices of the Singapore Turf Club and hosted by the Bukit Timah Race Course through 1999 when the track was closed to be replaced by the new Singapore Turf Club.

Since 1959 the race has been contested at various distances:
2414 metres  : 1959-1965, 1968, 1970–1975
2,425 metres: 1966
2,011 metres: 1967, 1969
2,400 metres (about): 1976
2,400 metres: 1977-1997
2,000 metres (about): 1998
2,000 metres: 1999-2017
1,800 metres: 2018 to present

At the time the race was modified to a distance of 2,000 metres in 1998. The conditions were also changed, making it open to four-year-old domestic horses only.

Records
Speed  record: (at current distance of 1800 metres)
 1:46.34 - Jupiter Gold (2018)

Most wins:
 2 - November Sun (1968, 1969)
 2 - Feu vert (1985, 1986)
 2 - Courtline Jester (1995, 1996)

Most wins by an owner:
 5 - Auric Stable (1970, 1975, 1990, 1995, 1996)

Most wins by a jockey:
 3 - Johnny L. Wilson (1963, 1972, 1975)

Most wins by a trainer:
 9 - Ivan Allan (1972, 1974, 1976, 1979, 1980, 1981, 1983, 1985, 1986)

Winners

† 2006 winner Our Falstaff was originally registered as Falstaff.
† 1991 winner Brixton Town was originally registered as Tamanaco

References

Graded stakes races in Singapore
Open middle distance horse races
Recurring events established in 1880
Sport in Singapore